The Cleveland, Cincinnati, Chicago and St. Louis Railway, also known as the Big Four Railroad and commonly abbreviated CCC&StL, was a railroad company in the Midwestern United States. It operated in affiliation with the New York Central system.

Its primary routes were in Illinois, Indiana, Michigan, and Ohio. At the end of 1925 it reported 2,391 route-miles and 4,608 track-miles; that year it carried 8180 million net ton-miles of revenue freight and 488 million passenger-miles.

History

The railroad was formed on June 30, 1889, by the merger of the Cleveland, Columbus, Cincinnati and Indianapolis Railway, the Cincinnati, Indianapolis, St. Louis and Chicago Railway and the Indianapolis and St. Louis Railway.  The following year, the company gained control of the former Indiana, Bloomington and Western Railway (through the foreclosed Ohio, Indiana and Western Railway and through an operating agreement with the Peoria and Eastern Railway).

In 1906, the Big Four was acquired by the New York Central Railroad, which operated it as a separate entity until around 1930. The Big Four's lines were later incorporated into Penn Central in 1968 with the merger of New York Central and the Pennsylvania Railroad.  Penn Central declared bankruptcy in 1970, and in 1976 many of Big Four's lines were included in the government-sponsored Conrail.  Conrail was privatized in 1987 and in 1997 was jointly acquired by CSX and Norfolk Southern.

Notable facilities

The railroad was headquartered in Indianapolis, Indiana, in the Chesapeake Building at 105 South Meridian Street. The building was constructed for the railroad in 1929 and was also known as the Big Four Building. In 1996, this multi-story structure became a Hampton Inn hotel.

Between 1904 and 1908 the railroad constructed a repair shop for steam locomotives and for passenger and freight cars in Beech Grove, Indiana. Amtrak purchased the facility, now known as the Beech Grove Shops, from the bankrupt Penn Central in 1975.

The railroad operated a terminal at Bellefontaine, Ohio, that included the largest roundhouse in use at that time between New York City and St. Louis, Missouri. Conrail closed the Bellefontaine terminal in 1983, and its roundhouse was dismantled.

A large yard facility known as the Big Four Yards is located in Avon, Indiana, along the line's tracks, now owned and operated by CSX.

In 1895, the railroad acquired what became known as the Big Four Bridge across the Ohio River at Louisville, Kentucky, thereby giving it access to that city. Use of the bridge for railroad purposes ceased by 1968, and it sat abandoned until work began by 2006 to convert it to use by pedestrians and bicyclists.

See also

 Purdue Wreck — 1903 train collision

References

External links

 History of The Cleveland Cincinnati Chicago and St Louis Railway and its predecessors from the 1913 Annual Report of The New York Central Railroad System.
Columbus, Ohio Railroads history page

 
Defunct companies based in Indianapolis
Rail transportation in Cincinnati
Defunct Illinois railroads
Defunct Indiana railroads
Defunct Ohio railroads
Defunct Michigan railroads
Defunct Missouri railroads
Former Class I railroads in the United States
Predecessors of the New York Central Railroad
Railway companies established in 1889
Railway companies disestablished in 1976
Railroads in the Chicago metropolitan area
1889 establishments in Indiana
1976 disestablishments in Indiana
Railroads controlled by the Vanderbilt family
Rail transportation in Cleveland